Mary Baker ( 1842–1856) was an English painter.

Mary Baker may also refer to:

Bonnie Baker (baseball) (Mary Geraldine Baker, 1918–2003), American baseball player
Mary Baker Eddy (1821–1910), born Mary Baker, founder of Christian Science
Mary Landon Baker (1901–1961), American socialite and heiress famous for her romantic life
Princess Caraboo (1791–1864), English impostor
Mary E. Baker (1923–1995), African-American community activist
Mary Baker McQuesten (1849–1934), born Mary Jane Baker, activist
Mary Ann Baker (1831–1921), American composer and singer
Mary Lou Baker (1914–1965), member of the Florida House of Representatives and women's rights activist